Sceloporus aeneus, the southern bunchgrass lizard or black-bellied bunchgrass lizard, is a species of lizard in the family Phrynosomatidae. It is endemic to Mexico.

References

Sceloporus
Endemic reptiles of Mexico
Reptiles described in 1828
Taxa named by Arend Friedrich August Wiegmann